HMCS Ungava was a  that served in the Royal Canadian Navy during the Second World War. She saw action in the Battle of the Atlantic and the Battle of the St. Lawrence. Following the war she was scrapped. She was named for Ungava Bay.

Design and description
They came in two versions powered by different engines; those with a diesel engines and those with vertical triple-expansion steam engines. Ungava was of the latter design and was larger than her diesel-engined cousins. She had a complement of 6 officers and 77 enlisted.

Ungava had two vertical triple-expansion steam engines, each driving one shaft, using steam provided by two Admiralty three-drum boilers.

Ungava was armed with a single quick-firing (QF) /40 caliber Mk IV gun mounted forward. For anti-aircraft purposes, the minesweeper was equipped with one QF 2-pounder Mark VIII and two single-mounted QF 20 mm Oerlikon guns. As a convoy escort, Ungava was deployed with deployed with 40 depth charges launched from two depth charge throwers and four chutes.

Service history
Ungava was ordered as part of the 1939–40 shipbuilding programme. The vessel's keel was laid down on 24 April 1940 by North Vancouver Ship Repairs Ltd. at North Vancouver and the minesweeper was launched on 9 October 1940. She was commissioned into the Royal Canadian Navy on 5 September 1941 at Vancouver.

After working up, Ungava was assigned to Halifax Force. She remained with the unit until May 1943 when she was ordered to join Gaspe Force, escorting convoys through the Saint Lawrence River. Later that year in December, she transferred back to Halifax Force and served with that unit for another five months. In May 1944 she transferred to Sydney Force, spending the rest of the year with that unit before returning to Halifax Force in February 1945.

Ungava served with the Halifax Force until April 1945, when she underwent a refit at Liverpool which lasted until May 1945. After returning from workups, she was used for miscellaneous duties along the eastern coast until being paid off on 3 April 1946. She was sold to T. Harris of Barber, New Jersey to be broken up in 1947.

See also
 List of ships of the Canadian Navy

References

Notes

Citations

Sources

External links
 Haze Gray and Underway
 ReadyAyeReady.com

 

Bangor-class minesweepers of the Royal Canadian Navy
Ships built in British Columbia
1940 ships
World War II minesweepers of Canada